This article serves as an index – as complete as possible – of all the honorific orders or similar decorations awarded by Portugal, classified by Monarchies chapter and Republics chapter, and, under each chapter, recipients' countries and the detailed list of recipients.

Awards

Monarchies 

European monarchies

United Kingdom 

 Queen Elizabeth II :
 Grand Sash and Cross of the Three Orders of Christ Aviz and Santiago (1955)
 Grand Collar of the Order of Saint James of the Sword (GColSE, 14 August 1979)
 Knight Grand Collar of the Military Order of the Tower and of the Sword, of Valour, Loyalty and Merit (GCTE, 27 April 1993)
 The Prince of Wales : Grand Cross of the Order of Aviz (GCA, 27 April 1993)

Norway 
See also decorations pages (mark °) : Harald, Sonja, Haakon, Mette-Marit, Mârtha Louise, Astrid & Ragnhild
 Mark * = recorded on ...

 Olav V of Norway:
 Grand Cross of the Military Order of Aviz° (GCA, 28/09/1928)*
 Grand Cross with Collar of the Order of St. James of the Sword° (GColSE, 11/10/1978)*
 Harald V of Norway:
 Grand Cross of the Military Order of Aviz° (GCa, 05/11/1980)*
 Grand Collar of the Order of Infante Dom Henrique° (GColIH, 13/02/2004)*
 Grand Cross with Collar of the Order of St. James of the Sword° (GCSE, 26/05/2008)*
 Queen Sonja of Norway:
 Grand Cross of the Order of Merit of Portugal° (02/01/1981)*
 Grand Cross of the Order of Infante Dom Henrique° (13/02/2004)*
 Grand Cross of the Order of Christ° (26/05/2008)*
 Haakon, Crown Prince of Norway: Grand Cross of the Order of Infante Dom Henrique° (13/02/2004)*
 Mette-Marit, Crown Princess of Norway: Grand Cross of the Order of Infante Dom Henrique° (13/02/2004)*
 Princess Märtha Louise of Norway: Grand Cross of the Order of Infante Dom Henrique° (13/02/2004)*
 Princess Ragnhild of Norway: Grand Cross of the Order of Merit (Portugal)° (02/01/1981)*
 Princess Astrid of Norway: Grand Cross of the Order of Merit (Portugal)° (02/01/1981)*

Sweden 
 Carl XVI Gustaf of Sweden : Grand Collar of the Order of Prince Henry (GColIH, 1987) & of the Order of Saint James of the Sword (GColSE, 02/05/2008)
 Queen Silvia of Sweden : Grand Cross of the Order of Christ (1987) & of the Order of Prince Henry (2008)

Denmark 
Official website pages (click on "Decorations") : Margrethe - Henrik - Frederik - Mary - Joachim - Marie - Benedikte

 Margrethe II of Denmark : Grand Collar of the Order of Prince Henry (GColIH, 20/06/1984) & of the Order of Saint James of the Sword (GColSE, 12/10/1992)
 Henrik, Prince Consort of Denmark : Grand Cross of the Order of Christ (GCC) & of the Order of Aviz (GCA)

Netherlands 
 Princess Beatrix of the Netherlands : Grand Collar of the Order of Prince Henry (14/05/1991)
 late Prince Claus of the Netherlands  : Grand Cross of the Order of Christ (14/05/1991)
 Princess Margriet of the Netherlands : Grand Cross of the Order of Christ (14/05/1991)
 Pieter van Vollenhoven : Grand Cross of the Order of Prince Henry (14/05/1991)

Belgium 

 King Philippe : Grand Cross of the Military Order of Aviz (18/09/1997) ; Grand Cross of the Order of Christ (08/03/2006)  
 Queen Mathilde : Grand Cross of the Order of Christ (08/03/2006), absent because of Emmanuel's birth on 4th Oct.
 King Albert II :
 Grand Cross of the Military Order of Aviz (11/12/1985)
 Grand Collar of the Order of the Infante Dom Henrique (13/12/1999) 
 Queen Paola : Grand Cross of the Order of Christ (13/12/1999) 
 Princess Astrid & Prince Lorenz : Grand-Cross of the Order of Infante Dom Henrique (08/03/2006) 
 Prince Laurent & Princess Claire : Grand-Cross of the Order of Infante Dom Henrique (08/03/2006) 
 King Baudouin : Grand Collar of the Order of Prince Henry (GColIH, 24/08/1982)
 Queen Fabiola : Grand Cross of the Order of Christ (24/08/1982)

Luxembourg 
 Jean, Grand Duke of Luxembourg (in retreat) :
 Grand Collar of the Order of Infante Dom Henrique
 379th Knight Grand Cross of the Order of the Tower and Sword
 Henri, Grand Duke of Luxembourg :
 Grand Collar of the Order of Prince Henry (GColIH, 05/05/2005)
 Grand Collar of the Order of Saint James of the Sword (GColSE, 07/09/2010)
 Maria Teresa, Grand Duchess of Luxembourg :
 Grand Cross of the Order of Christ (05/05/2005)
 Grand Cross of the Order of Saint James of the Sword (GCSE, 07/09/2010)
  House of Braganza : Honorary Grand Cross of the Order of Saint Isabel (27/10/2012)
 Princess Margaretha of Liechtenstein :
  House of Braganza : Honorary Grand Cross of the Order of Saint Isabel (27/10/2012)

Spain 

 Juan Carlos I of Spain :
 Grand Cross (20/05/1970) later Grand Collar (GCTE, 11/09/2000) of the Military Order of the Tower and of the Sword, of Valour, Loyalty and Merit
 Knight Grand Collar of the Order of Prince Henry (GColIH, 17/04/1978)
 Grand Collar of the Order of Saint James of the Sword (GColSE, 11/10/1978)
 Grand Collar of the Order of Liberty (13/10/1988)
 Grand Cross of the Order of Christ (Portugal) (23/08/1996)
 Grand Cross of the Order of Aviz (18/06/2007)
 Queen Sofía of Spain :
 Grand Cross of the Order of Christ (Portugal) (17/04/1978)
 Grand Cross of the Order of Prince Henry (13/10/1988)
 Dame Grand Cross decorated with Grand Cordon of the Order of St. James of the Sword (23/08/1996)
 Felipe, Prince of Asturias :
 Grand Cross of the Order of Christ (Portugal) (13/10/1988)
 Grand Cross of the Order of Aviz (22/04/1991)
 Grand Officer (23/08/1996) later Grand Cross (25/09/2006) of the Order of the Tower and Sword
 Letizia, Princess of Asturias : Grand Cross of the Order of Christ (Portugal) (25/09/2006)
 Infanta Elena, Duchess of Lugo :
 Grand Cross of the Order of Christ (Portugal) (13/10/1988)
 Grand Cross of the Order of Prince Henry (23/08/1996)
 Infanta Cristina, Duchess of Palma de Mallorca :
 Grand Cross of the Order of Christ (Portugal) (13/10/1988)
 Grand Cross of the Order of Prince Henry (23/08/1996)
 Infanta Margarita, 2nd Duchess of Hernani : Grand Cross of the Order of Prince Henry (13/10/1988)

Monaco 
 Prince Rainier III: Grand Cross of the Order of Saint James of the Sword (27/04/1964)

African monarchies

 Morocco 
 Hassan II of Morocco :
 Grand Collar of the Order of Prince Henry (GColIH, 26/03/1993)
 Grand Collar of the Order of Saint James of the Sword (GColSE, 29/11/1993)

Middle East monarchies

 Jordan 
 Abdullah II of Jordan  :
 Grand Collar of the Order of Prince Henry  (GColIH, 5 March 2008)
 Grand Collar of the Order of Saint James of the Sword  (GColSE, 6 March 2009)
 Queen Rania of Jordan :
 Grand Cross of the Order of Prince Henry  (GCIH, 5 March 2008)
 Grand Cross of the Order of Saint James of the Sword  (GCSE, 16 March 2009)

 Qatar 
 Hamad bin Khalifa Al Thani (1995-2013) : Grand Collar of the Order of Prince Henry  (GColIH, 20/04/2009)

Asian monarchies

 Thailand 

 King Bhumibol Adulyadej of Thailand : Grand Sash and Cross of the Three Orders of Christ, Aviz and Saint James of the Sword, 1960
 Queen Sirikit of Thailand : Grand Cross of the Order of Saint James of the Sword, 1960
 Crown Prince Vajiralongkorn of Thailand : Grand Cross of the Order of Aviz (GCA, 31/12/1981)

 Japan 
 Emperor Akihito :
 Grand Collar of the Order of Saint James of the Sword (GColSE, 02/12/1993)
 Grand Collar of the Order of Prince Henry (GColIH, 12/05/1998)
 Empress Michiko :
 Grand Cross of the Order of Saint James of the Sword (GCSE, 02/12/1993)
 Grand Cross of the Order of Prince Henry (GCIH, 12/05/1998)
 Crown Prince Naruhito : Grand Cross of the Order of Christ (GCC, 02/12/1993)
 Crown Princess Masako : Grand Cross of the Order of Prince Henry (GCIH, 02/12/1993)

 Former monarchies 

 Iran 
 Mohammad Reza Pahlavi:  Grand Collar of the Order of Prince Henry (GColIH, 27/07/1967)

 Sovereign entities 

 Order of Malta 

 Angelo de Mojana di Cologna (1962-1988) :
 Grand Cross of the Order of Christ (GCC, 21/09/1967)
 Grand Collar of the Order of Prince Henry (GColIH, 02/09/1983)
 Andrew Bertie (1988-2008)  :
 Grand Collar of the Order of Prince Henry (GColIH, 22/03/1990)
 Grand Collar of the Order of Saint James of the Sword (GColSE, 23/11/2010)

 Republics 

 Republics of Europe

 Austria 
According to Portuguese Presidency Website search form :

 President Rudolf Kirchschläger (1974-1986) : Grand Collar of the Order of Prince Henry (GColIH, 18/04/1984)

 President Thomas Klestil (1992-2004) : Grand Collar of the Order of Prince Henry (GColIH, 19/08/2002)
 President Heinz Fischer (2004-incumbent) :
 Grand Collar of the Order of Prince Henry (GColIH, 31/01/2005)
 Grand Collar of the Order of Saint James of the Sword (GColSE, 23/07/2009)

 Bulgaria 
According to Portuguese Presidency Website search form :
 President Todor Zhivkov (1954–1989) : Grand Collar of the Order of Prince Henry (GColIH, 21/08/1979)
 President Zhelyu Zhelev (1990-1997) : Grand Collar of the Order of Liberty (GColL, 13/09/1994)

 President Georgi Parvanov (2002-2012) : Grand Collar of the Order of Prince Henry (GColIH, 07/10/2002)

 Czech Republic 
 President Václav Havel : Grand Collar of the Order of Liberty (GColL, 13/12/1990)

 Estonia 

 President Arnold Rüütel (2001–2006) :
 Grand Collar of the Order of Prince Henry (GColIH, 29/05/2003)
 Grand Collar of the Order of Saint James of the Sword (GColSE, 08/03/2006)

 Finland 
According to Portuguese Presidency Website search form :

 President Mauno Henrik Koivisto (1982–1994) : Grand Collar of the Order of Prince Henry (GColIH, 22/04/1992)

 President Tarja Halonen (2000–2012) :  Grand Collar of the Order of Prince Henry (GColIH, 22/04/2002)

 France 
According to Portuguese Presidency Website search form :
 President Valéry Giscard d'Estaing (1974-1981) :
 Grand Collar of the Order of Saint James of the Sword (GColSE, 14/10/1975)
 Grand Collar of the Order of Prince Henry (GColIH, 21/10/1978)

 President François Mitterrand (1981-1995) :
 Grand Collar of the Order of Prince Henry (GColIH, 29/09/1983)
 Grand Collar of the Order of Liberty (GColL, 28/10/1987)

 President Jacques Chirac (1995-2007) : Grand Collar of the Order of Prince Henry (GColIH, 04/02/1999)

 Germany 
According to Portuguese Presidency Website search form :

 President Richard von Weizsäcker (1984–1994): Grand Collar of the Order of Prince Henry (GColIH, 19/06/1989)

 President Roman Herzog (1994–1999) : Grand Collar of the Order of Prince Henry (GColIH, 13/08/1998)

 President Horst Köhler (2004-2010) : Grand Collar of the Order of Prince Henry (GColIH, 02/03/2009)

 Greece 
According to Portuguese Presidency Website search form :

 President Christos Sartzetakis (1985–1990) : Grand Collar of the Order of Prince Henry (GColIH, 12/11/1990)
 President Konstantinos Stephanopoulos (1995–2005) : Grand Collar of the Order of Prince Henry (GColIH, 13/12/1999)

 Hungary 
According to Portuguese Presidency Website search form :
 President Pal Losonczi (1967–1987) :  Grand Collar of the Order of Prince Henry (GColIH, 14/08/1979)

 President Brunó Ferenc Straub (1988-1989) : Grand Collar of the Order of Prince Henry (GColIH, 12/11/1990)

 President Ferenc Mádl (2000–2005) : Grand Collar of the Order of Prince Henry (GColIH, 07/10/2002)

 Italy 
According to Portuguese Presidency Website search form :

 President Sandro Pertini (1978–1985) : Grand Collar of the Order of Saint James of the Sword (GColSE, 17/11/1980)
 President Francesco Cossiga (1985–1992) : Grand Collar of the Order of Prince Henry (GColIH, 22/03/1990)

 President Carlo Azeglio Ciampi (1999–2006) : Grand Collar of the Order of Prince Henry (GColIH, 03/01/2002)

 Latvia 

 President Vaira Vīķe-Freiberga (1999-2007) : Grand Collar of the Order of Prince Henry (GColIH, 29/05/2003)

 Lithuania 
According to Portuguese Presidency Website search form :

 President Valdas Adamkus (1998–2003, 2004–2009) : Grand Collar of the Order of Prince Henry (GColIH, 31/05/2007)

 President Rolandas Paksas : Grand Collar of the Order of Prince Henry (GColIH, 31/05/2007)

 Malta 
 President Edward Fenech Adami : Grand Collar of the Order of Prince Henry (GColIH, 11/12/2008)

 Poland 
According to Portuguese Presidency Website search form :
 President Henryk Jabłoński (1972–1985) : Grand Collar of the Order of Prince Henry (GColIH, 16/03/1976)
 Edward Gierek (First Secretary of the Polish United Workers' Party, 1970–80) : Grand Collar of the Order of Prince Henry (GColIH, 16/03/1976)
 Piotr Jaroszewicz (Prime Minister, 1970–80) : Grand Collar of the Order of Prince Henry (GColIH, 16/03/1976)

 President Lech Wałęsa (1990–1995) :
 Grand Collar of the Order of Liberty (GColL, 11/05/1993)
 Grand Collar of the Order of Prince Henry (GColIH, 18/10/1994)

 President Aleksander Kwaśniewski (1995–2005) : Grand Collar of the Order of Prince Henry (GColIH, 02/19/1997)

 President Lech Kaczyński (2005-2010) : Grand Collar of the Order of Prince Henry (GColIH, 01/09/2008)

 Bronisław Komorowski (2010-incumbent) : Grand Collar of the Order of Prince Henry (GColIH, 19/04/2012)

 Romania 
According to Portuguese Presidency Website search form :
 President Nicolae Ceaușescu (1974–1989) : Grand Collar of the Order of Saint James of the Sword (GColSE, 14/10/1975)
 Elena Ceaușescu, Nicolae Ceaușescu's wife : Grand Collar of the Order of Prince Henry (GColIH, 12/06/1975)

 President Emil Constantinescu (1996–2000) : Grand Collar of the Order of Prince Henry (GColIH, 15/03/2000)

 Serbia 
 President Tomislav Nikolić (2012- incumbent) : Grand Cross of the Order of Prince Henry

 Slovakia 

 President Ivan Gašparovič (2004-incumbent) : Grand Collar of the Order of Saint James of the Sword (GColSE, 04/09/2008)

 Slovenia 
 President Milan Kučan (1991-2002) : Grand Collar of the Order of Prince Henry (GColIH, 29/03/2000)

 Ukraine 
 President Leonid Kuchma (1994–2005) : Grand Collar of the Order of Prince Henry (GColIH, 16/04/1998)

 Yugoslavia 
 Josip Broz Tito (1953-1980) : Grand Collar of the Order of Prince Henry (GColIH, 02/04/1978)

 Republics of the Middle East

 Turkey 
 President Abdullah Gül (2007-2014) : Grand Collar of the Order of Prince Henry (GColIH, 10/05/2009)

 Republics of the Far East

 East Timor 
According to Portuguese Presidency Website search form :
 President Xanana Gusmão (2002-2007) : Grand Collar of the Order of Prince Henry (GColIH, 14/02/2006)
 President José Ramos-Horta (2007-2012) : Grand Collar of the Order of Prince Henry (GColIH, 13/11/2007)
 President Taur Matan Rua (2012-incumbent) : Grand Collar of the Order of Prince Henry (GColIH, 10/05/2012)

 Republics of America 

 Argentina 

 President Fernando de la Rúa (1999-2001) : Grand Collar of the Order of Prince Henry (GColIH, 14/11/2001)

 Brazil 
According to Portuguese Presidency Website search form :
 President Juscelino Kubitschek (1956–1961) : Grand Collar of the Order of Prince Henry (GColIH, 20/10/1960)

 President Humberto de Alencar Castelo Branco (1964–1967) : Grand Collar of the Order of Prince Henry (GColIH, 21/07/1965)

 President Emílio Garrastazu Médici (1969-1974) :
 Grand Collar of the Order of Saint James of the Sword (GColSE, 24/04/1972)
 Grand Collar of the Military Order of the Tower and of the Sword, of Valour, Loyalty and Merit (GCTE, 09/05/1973)
 President Ernesto Geisel (1974–1979) :
 Grand Collar of the Order of Saint James of the Sword (GColSE, 01/06/1977)
 Grand Collar of the Order of Prince Henry (GColIH, 13/02/1979)
 President João Figueiredo (1979–1985) : Grand Collar of the Order of Saint James of the Sword (GColSE, 22/09/1981)
 President José Sarney (1985-1990) : Grand Collar of the Order of Saint James of the Sword (GColSE, 14/07/1986)

 President Fernando Henrique Cardoso (1995–2003) :
 Grand Collar of the Order of Liberty (GColL, 04/10/1995)
 Grand Collar of the Order of Saint James of the Sword (GColSE, 18/08/1997)
 Grand Collar of the Order of Prince Henry (GColIH, 14/03/2000)

 President Luiz Inácio Lula da Silva (2003–2011) : Grand Collar of the Order of Liberty (GColL, 23/07/2003)

 Chile 
According to Portuguese Presidency Website search form :
 President Patricio Aylwin Azócar (1990-1994) : Grand Collar of the Order of Liberty (GColL, 26/08/1992)

 President Ricardo Lagos (2000-2006) : Grand Collar of the Order of Prince Henry (GColIH, 26/09/2001)

 Mme President Michelle Bachelet (2006–2010) : Grand Collar of the Order of Prince Henry (GColIH, 07/11/2007)

 Colombia 

 President Virgilio Barco Vargas (1986-1990) : Grand Collar of the Order of Prince Henry (GColIH, 04/02/1989)

 President Juan Manuel Santos (2010-incumbent) : Grand Collar of the Order of Prince Henry (GColIH, 14/11/2012)

 Ecuador 

 President Rodrigo Borja Cevallos (1988–1992) : Grand Collar of the Order of Prince Henry (GColIH, 22/03/1990)

 Mexico 

 President Ernesto Zedillo (1994-2000) : Grand Collar of the Order of Prince Henry (GColIH, 30/09/1998)

 Nicaragua 
 President Anastasio Somoza Debayle (1967–72, 1974–79) : Grand Collar of the Order of Prince Henry (GColIH, 19/02/1968)

 Paraguay 

 President Juan Carlos Wasmosy : Grand Collar of the Order of Prince Henry (GColIH, 17/12/1995)
 President Nicanor Duarte Frutos : Grand Collar of the Order of Prince Henry (GColIH, 21/09/2005)

 Peru 
 President Ollanta Humala Tasso : Grand Collar of the Order of Prince Henry (GColIH, 19/11/2012)

 Venezuela 
According to Portuguese Presidency Website search form :
 President Carlos Andrés Pérez (1974–1979, 1989-1993) : Grand Collar of the Order of Saint James of the Sword (GColSE, 01/06/1977)

 President Jaime Lusinchi (1984-1989) : Grand Collar of the Order of Prince Henry (GColIH, 21/01/1987)

 President Rafael Caldera (1994-1999) : Grand Collar of the Order of Prince Henry (GColIH, 17/10/1997)
 President Hugo Chávez (1999–2013) : Grand Collar of the Order of Prince Henry (GColIH, 08/11/2001)

 Republics of Africa 

 Algeria 

 President Abdelaziz Bouteflika (1999-incumbent) : Grand Collar of the Order of Prince Henry (GColIH, 14/01/2003)

 Angola 

 President José Eduardo dos Santos (1979-incumbent) :
 Grand Collar of the Order of Prince Henry (GColIH, 25/01/1988)
 Grand Collar of the Order of Saint James of the Sword (GColSE, 16/01/1996)

 Cape Verde 
According to Portuguese Presidency Website search form :
 President Aristides Pereira (1975-1991) :
 Grand Collar of the Order of Prince Henry (GColIH, 31/01/1986)
 Grand Collar of the Order of Saint James of the Sword (GColSE, 09/08/1989)
 President António Mascarenhas Monteiro (1991-2001) :
 Grand Collar of the Order of Liberty (GColL, 11/11/1991)
 Grand Collar of the Order of Prince Henry (GColIH, 08/06/2000)
 President Pedro Pires (2001-2011) : Grand Collar of the Order of Prince Henry (GColIH, 22/04/2002)
 President Jorge Carlos Fonseca (2011-incumbent) : Grand Collar of the Order of Prince Henry (GColIH, 11/06/2012)

 Democratic Republic of Congo (Zaire) 
 President Mobutu Sese Seko (1965–1997) :  Grand Collar of the Order of Prince Henry (GColIH, 12/12/1984)

 Republic of the Congo 
 President Denis Sassou Nguesso (1997-incumbent) :  Grand Collar of the Order of Prince Henry (GColIH, 24/11/1984)

 Egypt 
 President Mohamed Hosni Mubarak (1981–2011): Grand Collar of the Order of Prince Henry (GColIH, 19/08/1983)

 Gabon 
 President Omar Bongo (1967–2009) : Grand Collar of the Order of Prince Henry (GColIH, 17/12/2001)

 Gambia 
 President Dawda Jawara (1970-1994) : Grand Collar of the Order of Prince Henry (GColIH, 04/10/1993)

 Guinea-Bissau 
 President João Bernardo Vieira (1980–99, 2005–2009) : Grand Collar of the Order of Saint James of the Sword (GColSE, 01/07/1996)

 Mali 

 President Alpha Oumar Konaré (1992-2002) : Grand Collar of the Order of Prince Henry (GColIH, 27/02/2002)

 Mozambique 
 President Samora Machel (1975–1986) : Grand Collar of the Order of Prince Henry (GColIH, 30/08/1982)
 President Joaquim Chissano (1986-2005) :
 Grand Collar of the Order of Prince Henry (GColIH, 09/04/1990)
 Grand Collar of the Order of Saint James of the Sword (GColSE, 21/04/1997)

 Namibia 
 President Sam Nujoma (1990–2005) : Grand Collar of the Order of Liberty (GColL, 11/10/1995)

 São Tomé and Príncipe 
 President Manuel Pinto da Costa (1976–91, 2011-incumbent'') :  Grand Collar of the Order of Prince Henry (GColIH, 31/01/86)

Senegal 
 President Léopold Sédar Senghor (1960–1980) : Grand Collar of the Order of Saint James of the Sword (GColSE, 13/03/1975)

South Africa 
 former President Nelson Mandela (1994–1999) : Grand Collar of the Order of Prince Henry (GColIH, 20/11/1995)

See also 
 Mirror page : List of honours of the Presidents of Portugal by country

References 

 
Portugal